Fortunately, Unfortunately is a word game first played at conventions of the National Puzzlers' League in the late 1980s. It was invented and introduced by one-time NPL president David Scott Marley. A version of the game, called "Good News, Bad News" was popularized by the BBC radio show I'm Sorry I Haven't A Clue. The game is best played in groups with an odd number of people. It is often played on Internet forums.

Gameplay
The Fortunately, Unfortunately word game follows a standard format:

One person begins with a sentence (e.g., One day Little Johnny walked to the local shoe shop).
The next person tells of something unfortunate that happens (e.g., Unfortunately, Little Johnny was hit by a car.).
The following person contributes a fortunate event (e.g., Fortunately, the car was made entirely of marshmallows).
The fourth person will contribute an unfortunate event (e.g., Unfortunately, Johnny was allergic to marshmallows.)
The fifth person will contribute a fortunate event (e.g.,  Fortunately, Johnny didn't eat any of the car.), and the process is repeated

The game does not have any specified endpoint, unless players agree to add some kind of scoring system.

Book
There is a children's book named "Fortunately" by Remy Charlip that follows this same pattern, first published in 1964.

Serial Soliloquy Variation
Rather than making a single "Fortunately..." (or "Unfortunately...") statement, each person in the group can provide a long alternating list of sentences/statements.  The psychological and comic effect of this form of the game is somewhat different because the same person is forced to flip rapidly between a positive and negative outlook.  Players take turns in an intuitive way, like performers handing the "solo" off to another member of the group.  Because of the more continuous thread of consciousness underlying the series of "Fortunately/Unfortunately" statements, this variation can also be used as a form of meditation or humor-assisted therapy.

Performers at the Studio for Interrelated Media (SIM) experimented with this game in the early 1990s. Now it is commonly played within MENSA groups and with members of MENSA.

References

External links
 Purple Rose Puzzles

Word games